, is a Thai baseball pitcher. Heepthong is listed as 5'9" tall (175 cm) and 159 pounds (72 kg). He pitched for Thailand national baseball team in the 2006 Asian games which was held in Doha, Qatar, as well as the 2007 Baseball World Cup. His fastball can reach approximately 142~144 km/h(about 88.2~89.5MPH) with good command.

References 

1986 births
Living people
Krissada Heebthong
Krissada Heebthong
Baseball players at the 2006 Asian Games
Krissada Heebthong
Krissada Heebthong